Autosticha pachysticta is a moth in the family Autostichidae. It was described by Edward Meyrick in 1936. It is found in Korea, Japan (Honshu, Shikoku, Kyushu, Ryukyus) and Sichuan, China.

References

Moths described in 1936
Autosticha
Moths of Asia